Woudenberg is a town and municipality in the central Netherlands, in the province of Utrecht. In 2021, it had a population of 13,639.

There are forests in the western part of the municipality in which the Pyramid of Austerlitz is located. The municipality also borders the province of Gelderland to the east.

Etymology 
The name Woudenberg refers to a forested hill; nowadays the town lies in an agricultural area about 8 km south of Amersfoort.

Topography

Dutch Topographic map of the municipality of Woudenberg, 2013.

Economy 
The main sources of income were the raising of livestock and the cultivation of tobacco. Currently, most people work out of town, mostly in the surrounding towns of Amersfoort, Utrecht and Veenendaal.

Tourism
Because of the many attractions nearby, such as the Grebbe, the Pyramid of Austerlitz and the Henschotermeer, Woudenberg is visited by many tourists. That can also be derived from the number of tourist accommodation, which is 12.

Notable people 
 Arie de Vroet (1918 – 1999 in Woudenberg) footballer
 Erik Verlinde & Herman Verlinde (born 1962) identical twin brothers and theoretical physicists and string theorist
 Ricky van Wolfswinkel (born 1989) professional footballer

Gallery

References

External links 

Official website

 
Municipalities of Utrecht (province)
Populated places in Utrecht (province)